General Sir William O'Grady Haly  (2 January 1811 – 19 March 1878) was a British Army officer who was the Commander of the British Troops in Canada.

Early life and family
Haly was one of five surviving children born to Richard Aylmer Haly of Wadhurst Castle, Sussex and his wife, Amelia Banister. The family lived largely on his mother's annual stipend from her father, Richard Banister.

Military career

Haly was commissioned as an ensign in the 4th Regiment of Foot on 17 June 1828.

In 1831, Haly became a Lieut. in the 47th Regiment and made Captain by 1834.

In the Crimean War, Haly was wounded in the Battle of Inkerman (1854) and was rescued by Brevet Major Hugh Rowlands and John McDermond, both of whom received the Victoria Cross for their actions. Haly received the Order of the Medjidie.

After fighting in the Crimean War, he became Commander of the British Troops in Canada in 1873. He was given the colonelcy of the 47th (Lancashire) Regiment of Foot from 1875 to his death. and promoted General on 1 October 1877.

He died in office from gout on 19 March 1878. He is buried in the Fort Massey Cemetery.

Family
In November 1839 Haly married Harriett Hebden: their eldest son was Major General Richard Hebden O'Grady Haly.

References

|-

1811 births
1878 deaths
British Army generals
King's Own Royal Regiment officers
British Army personnel of the Crimean War
Knights Commander of the Order of the Bath
Recipients of the Order of the Medjidie